Nadamat is a Pakistani television series aired on Hum TV during 2012. It is directed by Dilawar Malik and written by K Rehman. It shows the struggle of a woman after she gets married, and how she sacrifices and pushes through obstacles to keep her marriage going. At the end, she does that achieve that, but at a cost.

Plot 
Nadamat is the narrative of essentially every family of our society. The plot mirrors the hard disposition of individuals and the obliteration that it causes.

The everyday routine of Dr. Tania transforms her into an experiencing hellfire inferable from her father, Nawab Shuja ud Din's one mix-up. As she goes out and goes to live with her better half, Sohail, she is stood up to by considerably more obstacles. Her dull past follows her like a shadow in her present for her husband treats her with doubt and contempt constantly. Other significant characters of the story are the couple pair Nasir and Kiran, and Nasir's sibling, Taifor. What disarray will Taifor, who has lived abroad, bring into his sibling and sister-in-law's lives? What sort of difficulties will Tania's past make for her? How can she handle her present?

Cast
 Sanam Baloch as Dr. Tania
 Sajid Hasan Nawab Shuja ud Din
 Shakeel as Sohail
 Jahanara Hai as Kiran's mother
 Soniya Hussain
 Ayesha Gul as Zoha
 Taifoor Khan as Nasir
 Zhalay Sarhadi as Kiran
 Bindiya as Farzana
 Shahood Alvi
 Khizar Awan
 Imran Ashraf

References

2012 Pakistani television series debuts
Pakistani drama television series
Urdu-language television shows
Hum TV original programming
2012 Pakistani television series endings